Non is a Welsh feminine given name. Notable people with the name include:

Non Evans (born 1974), Welsh sportswoman
Non Stanford (born 1989), Welsh triathlete
 Saint Non, fifth and sixth-century Welsh female saint

Welsh feminine given names